Shecaniah or Shechaniah, which means "one intimate with God", is the name of a number of characters mentioned in the Hebrew Bible.

A priest to whom the tenth lot came forth when David divided the priests (1 Chronicles 24:11).
One of the priests who were set "to give to their brethren by courses" of the daily portion (2 Chronicles 31:15).
Shechani'ah, a priest whose sons are mentioned in 1 Chronicles 3:21, 22.
Ezra 8:5.
The first of the Jews who responded to Ezra's prayer regarding the returning exiles' marriages with foreigners.
The father of Shemaiah, who repaired the wall of Jerusalem (Nehemiah 3:29).
The father-in-law of Tobiah (Nehemiah 6:18).
A priest who returned from the Babylonian captivity with Zerubbabel (Nehemiah 12:3; marg., or Shebaniah).

References

Books of Chronicles people
Set index articles on Hebrew Bible people